Spoken Words is the 1989 debut studio album by Australian pop group, Indecent Obsession. It was released in Australia in November 1989. It includes two singles which reached the top twenty in Australia: "Say Goodbye" and "Tell Me Something".

The album was released in North America and Europe in 1990 as a self-titled release. Indecent Obsession peaked at number 148 on the Billboard 200.

Track listing
Australia Spoken Words release (105221-1)
 "Tell Me Something" - 4:19
 "Believe" - 4:30
 "Nowhere to Hide" - 4:11
 "Dream After Dream" - 4:21
 "Spoken Words" - 3:31
 "Never Gonna Stop" - 3:58
 "Going Down" - 3:53
 "Come Back to Me" - 4:49
 "Survive the Heat" - 5:25
 "Say Goodbye"	- 4:07
 "Say Goodbye" (Girth Mix) - 4:36 (CD Bonus Track)
 "Take Me Higher" - 3:29(CD Bonus Track)

North America Indecent Obsession release
 "Tell Me Something" - 4:19
 "Going Down" - 3:53
 "Say Goodbye"	- 4:47
 "Dream After Dream" - 4:21
 "Never Gonna Stop" - 3:51
 "Spoken Words" - 3:31
 "Survive the Heat" - 5:25
 "Come Back to Me" - 4:49
 "Nowhere to Hide" - 4:11
 "Believe" - 4:30

Weekly charts

Credits
 Drums, percussion – Darryl Sims
 Guitar – Andrew Coyne
 Keyboards – Michael Szumowski
 Lead vocals – David Dixon

References

External links
 "Spoken Words" by Indecent Obsession at Discogs
 "Indecent Obsession" by Indecent Obsession at Discogs

1989 debut albums
Indecent Obsession albums